, known in Western order as Aoshi Shinomori in the English version of the anime, is a fictional character in the Rurouni Kenshin manga series created by Nobuhiro Watsuki. He is the genius young  of the Oniwabanshū for Edo Castle. After the Meiji Restoration Shinomori alone was offered rankings in the military, however, instead of abandoning his comrades, he decided to work with them for Takeda Kanryū. This decision leads to the death of his comrades and his defeat by Himura Kenshin, which results in driving him mad. For the remainder of the series, Shinomori swears to kill Kenshin at any cost in order to gain the title of "the strongest" and bestow this title upon the graves of his fallen comrades.

Creation and conception

Nobuhiro Watsuki based Shinomori on Hijikata Toshizō, the Vice-Commander of the Shinsengumi. There are most certainly versions of Hijikata portrayed in books and fiction; Aoshi grew out of the Hijikata who killed his gentler feelings and buried his human weakness. Watsuki describes himself as a fan of the other version of Hijikata. Watsuki describes that version of Hijikata, seen in Moeyo Ken (Burn, O Sword), as "a bundle of raw combat-instinct who keeps fighting until the very death." Since, according to Watsuki, the addition of the Oniwabanshū occurred during the "last minute," he found difficulty writing with him since he had not resolved a "concrete image" for Aoshi. Watsuki says that he used no specific design model for Aoshi. As the image of Hijikata grew stronger within Watsuki, the Rurouni Kenshin author added fringes (bangs) to Aoshi's design. Watsuki held a chance to change the hairstyle while compiling the edited manga, but chose not to edit the hairstyle, since he did not want readers to believe that "Aoshi was wearing a rug or anything."

Watsuki said he originally intended for his design of the 13-year-old "young Aoshi" to be used for another character. He says that many female readers liked young Aoshi. He described drawing Aoshi's fringes as "a pain."

During the run of the Kyoto arc, Watsuki reported receiving a reader letter that said "I'll bet Aoshi is gonna be another one of those characters who just happens to be around to help Kenshin in times of need." The letter "kind of got to" Watsuki and he told himself that Aoshi is going to be a "bad guy." As a response Watsuki decided to make Aoshi an antagonist in the arc and fight Okina (Kashiwazaki Nenji), his former master.

Shinomori is portrayed by Yusuke Iseya in the second and third live-action films, Rurouni Kenshin: Kyoto Inferno and Rurouni Kenshin: The Legend Ends.

Appearances

Born in January 1853 in Tokyo Prefecture, Shinomori Aoshi was raised a ninja of the Oniwabanshū, who worked for the Shogunate government during the Edo period. At the suggestion of Kashiwazaki Nenji (better known as Okina), Shinomori was given the position of Okashira at the age of fifteen, in time for the Oniwabanshou to defend Edo Castle. As a member of the Oniwabanshuu, he helped to raise Makimachi Misao from childhood. Misao, who was his protegee developed a strong admiration and romantic feelings for him. Aoshi is a grandmaster and Okashira of the Oniwanbanshou shinobi. Aoshi's weapon of choice is a kodachi, a sword that is described in the series to act like a shield because its light weight makes it easy to block with. He originally used only one of these short swords for defense and relied mainly on kenpo for his offense, but later used a two-sworded style.

After the revolution, since a few members of the Oniwabanshū were unable to adapt to life in the Meiji era, Aoshi and these members worked for the corrupt, power-hungry business man, Takeda Kanryū instead. Aoshi's subordinates included Beshimi, who specialized in darts and poison; Hyottoko, whose name literally means "Fire Man" who breathes fire; Han'nya, a skilled martial artist and deft ninjutsu practitioner; and Shikijō, a scarred "muscle man". During the early chapters of the manga, the Oniwabanshū work to capture Takani Megumi under orders from Kanryu. This leads them to clash with Kenshin and his allies who want to stop Megumi's work involving opium. As the oniwabanshu are defeated by Kenshin and his friends, Kanryu betrays them and tries to kill them. Aoshi is the only survivor who escapes to become stronger to kill Kenshin and obtain the title of the strongest in favor of his dead subordinates.

Following his training, Shishio Makoto's forces hire Shishio to aid them in their fight against Kenshin who is now aided by the remaining retired Oniwabanshu. This leads to Aoshi having to personally confront and nearly kill Okina. Misao is shocked to see how coldblooded Aoshi has become and tells Kenshin to kill him. Kenshin refuses, claiming that the Kaiten Kenbu should have killed Okina but Aoshi is still retaining his humanity. During their rematch, Kenshin wakes up Aoshi's past persona and defeats him with his own ogi. When Kenshin is defeated by Shishio, Aoshi briefly replaces him as he states that Kenshin only lost due to his previous wounds. After Shishio dies in combat, the former Okashira stays in Kyoto.

In the final arc of the series, Aoshi and Misao are requested by Okina to take a diary to Tokyo. Once they reach Tokyo, Aoshi solves Yukishiro Enishi's trick of having orchestrated the fake death of Kamiya Kaoru. He then joins Saito Hajime in finding his hideout. After they are successful, Aoshi and Misao join Kenshin's group to rescue Kaoru from Enishi which Aoshi contributes by defeating one of his bodyguards. Following their victory, Aoshi and Misao return to Kyoto but make a brief shortcut to plant flowers in their late allies' graves.

Reception
Daryl Surat of Otaku USA said that while, in Surat's view, Aoshi does not engaged in "meaningful" battles, the character scored highly in popularity polls among readers because Aoshi appears "like a CLAMP character wearing Gambit's coat." Surat used Aoshi as an example of Rurouni Kenshin being a "neo-shonen" work that appeals to both boys and girls. T.H.E.M. Anime Reviews praised the Oniwabanshu organization for acting not like stereotypical villains and instead characters who could also work as heroes. Mania.com remarks the build up Aoshi, Saito and other characters bring to the story due to how they similar goals but felt that Misao's attempts to reach Aoshi might be annoying. Mania praised the second match between Shinomori and Kenshin despite the apparent rehash but noted there were parallels between both fighters with Sagara's line regarding how Shinomori is ready to die after the battle while Kenshin, on the other hand, comes across as a warrior who achieved a desire to survive to all battles. Similarly, Chris Beveridge from Mania Entertainment praised the build up the anime's Kyoto arc has had as after fighting so much build up in the too based on how Shinomori, Saito and Sagara try to back up the weakened Kenshin to aid him in defeating Shishio Makoto but the execution felt like a writer copout. Due to Kaoru, Kenshin and Sanosuke missing from the final arc during the Jinchu arc, Manga News described Aoshi as the star of the series' 24th volume due to how he explores the mysteries behind Enishi's revenge and his subsequent actions that made him stand out most notably because he had been absent for multiple chapters.

Iseya's portrayal of Shinomori also received good response with describing his character as "melodramatic" with a "vengeful demeanor", J Generation also praised Shinomori's characterization for how he fits in Kyoto Inferno due to his connections with Shishio but lamented how he does not get to fight Kenshin in this film. Filmedinether felt that despite changes in regards to Shinomori's story from the original series, his character fits well into the manga and praised his fight scenes. Marcus Goh from Yahoo! regarded his duel with Kenshin as the best fight in the films. On the other hand, Anime News Network lamented the screentime the cast in general has in Kyoto Inferno as he and Misao "are shortchanged by the larger demands of the story." For the third film, the same site said that "the resolution for characters like Aoshi feels undercooked".

References

Comics characters introduced in 1994
Fictional assassins in comics
Fictional ninja
Fictional characters based on real people
Fictional characters from Tokyo
Fictional kenjutsuka
Fictional kenpō practitioners
Fictional Japanese people in anime and manga
Fictional male martial artists
Fictional mercenaries in comics
Fictional Ninjutsu practitioners
Fictional swordfighters in anime and manga
Male characters in anime and manga
Martial artist characters in anime and manga
Rurouni Kenshin characters